Francisco Teixeira may refer to:
Francisco Teixeira de Queiroz (1848–1919), Portuguese writer
Francisco Gomes Teixeira (1851–1933), Portuguese mathematician
Francisco Nunes Teixeira (1910–1999), Portuguese bishop
Francisco Teixeira (footballer) (born 1998), Portuguese footballer